is a Japanese manga written and illustrated by Akira Sasō. The story depicts a 13-year-old piano child prodigy, Uta Naruse, who helps 19-year-old Wao Kikuna, enter a conservatory to study the piano.

Media
The manga was serialized in Futabasha's seinen manga magazine, Weekly Manga Action. The individual chapters were collected into four bound volumes, which Futabasha released from May 28, 1998 to August 28, 1998. Futabasha re-released the manga into three volumes, which were all released on December 19, 2003.

The manga was adapted into a novel by Koji Hagiuda, which Futabasha released on March 15, 2007. Epic/Sony Records released a soundtrack CD on March 21, 2007.

The novel was further adapted into a live action film, with Koji Hagiuda directing his own novel and screenplay written by Kousuke Mukai, which premiered in Japan on April 27, 2007. Riko Narumi was cast as Uta and Kenichi Matsuyama was cast as Wao. The theme music was performed by Mito of Clammbon. VAP released the film's DVD on November 21, 2007.

Reception
The manga received the excellence award in the manga division for the 2nd Japan Media Arts Festival and the award for excellence for the 3rd Tezuka Osamu Cultural Prize in 1999.

The Japan Times' Mark Schilling commends Riko Narumi's performance as Uta, "which is forceful, but somehow mysterious, like the fierce-eyed girls painted by Yoshitomo Nara." Chris Magee commends the film as "a truly touching and surprisingly grown up look at just how difficult it can be for people, young or old, to come to terms with their talents and strengths, but also their faults and their weaknesses."

References

External links

Adventures of Modern Comics: From Katsuhiro Ohtomo to Natsume Ono  (pg. 299-305)

1997 manga
Seinen manga
Music in anime and manga
2007 films
2007 Japanese novels
Manga adapted into films
Winner of Tezuka Osamu Cultural Prize (Award for Excellence)
Futabasha manga
Japanese musical drama films
Live-action films based on manga
Works about pianos and pianists